"Afterimage" is a song by the Canadian rock band Rush. It was released on their 1984 album Grace Under Pressure. The track was dedicated to Robbie Whelan, a friend of the band who worked as an assistant engineer on some of Rush's earlier albums, most notably Moving Pictures and Signals, who was killed in an automobile accident in 1983.   The song deals with the loss of a friend and the emotional aftermath that follows.

The single was a Japan-only release.  The opening lyric was quoted in the liner notes for Rush's 1998 live release, Different Stages, as a dedication to drummer Neil Peart's daughter and wife, who died in 1997 and 1998, respectively.  The memoriam is as follows:

"Suddenly...you were gone...from all the lives you left your mark upon..."In loving memory of Jackie and Selena.

See also
List of songs recorded by Rush

References

1984 singles
Rush (band) songs
1984 songs
Mercury Records singles
Songs written by Neil Peart
Songs written by Geddy Lee
Songs written by Alex Lifeson